Douglas C. Prasher (born August 1951) is an American molecular biologist.  He is known for his work to clone and sequence the genes for the photoprotein aequorin and green fluorescent protein (GFP) and for his proposal to use GFP as a tracer molecule. He communicated his pioneering work to Martin Chalfie and Roger Y. Tsien, but by 1991 was himself unable to obtain further research funding, and left academia. Eventually, he had to abandon science. Chalfie and Tsien were awarded the 2008 Nobel Prize in Chemistry for work that they publicly acknowledged was substantially based on the work of Douglas Prasher, and through their efforts and those of others, Douglas Prasher returned to scientific research work in June 2010.

Career 
Prasher received his Ph.D. in biochemistry from the Ohio State University in 1979. From 1979 to 1983, he worked in genetics and biochemistry research at the University of Georgia, where he identified the gene sequence for aequorin. He then joined the Biology Department of the Woods Hole Oceanographic Institution, Woods Hole, Massachusetts where he studied bioluminescence.  In 1988, he received a two-year, $200,000 grant from the American Cancer Society to clone the gene for green fluorescent protein (GFP), the protein that gives the jellyfish its glow. Prasher succeeded in this project, and later shared his findings with Martin Chalfie and Roger Tsien after each scientist had communicated with him.  In subsequent years, Prasher provided the clone to hundreds of scientists.

Reports that Prasher had difficulty in achieving fluorescence of GFP in other species in recombinant studies are inaccurate, as Prasher had successfully worked with the Chalfie group to show recombinant expression in the bacterium E. coli and the nematode C. elegans, and later in the plant Arabidopsis thaliana. By the time Prasher's ACS funding ended, he had isolated a partial, but almost complete gfp cDNA, with 965 bases out of the 1,050 bases of the corresponding mRNA. It would require construction of another cDNA library during the following (non-funded) year for Prasher to isolate a full-length cDNA clone, although it must be noted that this partial cDNA clone was subsequently used and found to be sufficient for successful heterologous expression in E. coli, C. elegans and A. thaliana. By this time, Prasher could not afford to devote limited resources to expression studies in E. coli. It wasn't until the Nobel Prize announcement that it became clear how unfortunate this had been. Chalfie and Tsien went on to their successful expression studies. GFP has subsequently found application as a biochemical tracer in areas such as fluorescent studies of gene expression.

Prasher had applied to the National Institutes of Health for funding but had been turned down, and by the time he was undergoing review for promotion from assistant to untenured associate, he had decided to leave academia. Subsequently, Prasher worked for the Animal & Plant Health Inspection Service, U.S. Department of Agriculture at its Otis Plant Protection Center in Cape Cod, Massachusetts as a population geneticist, and was later transferred to the Plant Germplasm Quarantine & Biotechnology Laboratory in Beltsville, Maryland.  After working conditions deteriorated at the Beltsville location, he went to work for NASA subcontractor AZ Technology in Huntsville, Alabama, working on an existing project to develop lab-on-a-chip devices to monitor cabin environment and to perform human diagnostics during long-term spaceflight. However, he lost his job after 1.5 years when NASA reorganized and canceled the project.

On 8 October 2008, the 2008 Nobel Prize in Chemistry was awarded to Osamu Shimomura, Chalfie, and Tsien for their work on GFP.  Prasher was not included among the Nobel laureates, as only three individuals can share in a single Nobel Prize. Chalfie said of Prasher's contribution: "(Prasher's) work was critical and essential for the work we did in our lab. They could've easily given the prize to Douglas and the other two and left me out." Tsien also agreed that they couldn't have done it without Prasher and "Doug Prasher had a very important role."

In an October 9, 2008 phone interview with National Public Radio (NPR) and October 14, 2008 TV interview with Inside Edition, Prasher reported that he was unable to find a job in science, his life savings had run out, and he was working as a courtesy shuttle bus driver for a Toyota dealership in Huntsville at $8.50 an hour. In the NPR broadcast, one of his former colleagues called Prasher's current situation a "staggering waste of talent".  Prasher stated his wish to resume a career in science but not particularly with jellyfish. He also expressed his pleasure at learning of the awarding of the Nobel Prize to Shimomura, Chalfie, and Tsien: "I'm really happy for them. I was really surprised that particular topic carried that much weight."

Chalfie and Tsien invited Prasher and his wife, Virginia Eckenrode, to attend the Nobel Prize ceremony, as their guests and at their expense. All three of the 2008 Chemistry laureates thanked Prasher in their speeches.

In June 2010, Prasher was finally able to return to science, working for Streamline Automation in Huntsville until December 2011, and then from 2012 to 2015 in Tsien's lab at the University of California in San Diego.

Publications
 Prasher, D., McCann, R.O., Cormier, M.J., Cloning and expression of the cDNA coding for aequorin, a bioluminescent calcium-binding protein.  Biochem. Biophys. Res. Comm., 126, 1259-1268 (1985).
 Richard, J.P., Prasher, D.C., Ives, D.H., Frey, P.A., Chiral [18O]phosphorothioates. The stereochemical course of thiophosphoryl group transfer catalyzed by nucleoside phosphotransferase.  J. Biol. Chem., 254(11), 4339-4341 (1979).
 Prasher, D.C., Carr, M.C., Ives, D.H., Tsai, T.C., Frey, P.A., Nucleoside phosphotransferase from barley. Characterization and evidence for ping pong kinetics involving phosphoryl enzyme.  J. Biol. Chem., 257(9), 4931-4939 (1982).
 Prasher, D.C., Conarro, L., Kushner, S.R., Amplification and purification of exonuclease I from Escherichia coli K12.  J. Biol. Chem., 258(10), 6340-6343 (1983)
 Prasher, D.C., McCann, R.O., Longiaru, M., Cormier, M.J., Sequence comparisons of complementary DNAs encoding aequorin isotypes.  Biochemistry, 26(5), 1326-1332 (1987).
 Phillips, G.J., Prasher, D.C., Kushner, S.R., Physical and biochemical characterization of cloned sbcB and xonA mutations from Escherichia coli K-12.  J. Bacteriol., 170(5), 2089-2094 (1988).
 Cormier, M.J., Prasher, D.C., Longiaru, M., McCann, R.O., The enzymology and molecular biology of the Ca2+-activated photoprotein, aequorin.  Photochem. Photobiol., 49(4), 509-512 (1989).
 Prasher, D.C., O'Kane, D., Lee, J., Woodward, B., The lumazine protein gene in Photobacterium phosphoreum is linked to the lux operon.  Nucleic Acids Res., 18(21), 6450 (1990).
 O'Kane, D.J., Woodward, B., Lee, J., Prasher, D.C., Borrowed proteins in bacterial bioluminescence.  Proc. Natl. Acad. Sci. USA, 88(4), 1100-1104 (1991).
 O'Kane, D.J., Prasher, D.C., Evolutionary origins of bacterial bioluminescence.  Mol. Microbiol., 6(4), 443-449 (1992).
 Prasher, D.C., Eckenrode, V.K., Ward, W.W., Prendergast F.G., Cormier, M.J., Primary structure of the Aequorea victoria green-fluorescent protein.  Gene, 111(2), 229-233 (1992).
 Hannick, L.I., Prasher, D.C., Schultz, L.W., Deschamps, J.R., Ward, K.B., Preparation and initial characterization of crystals of the photoprotein aequorin from Aequorea victoria.  Proteins, 15(1), 103-107 (1993).
 Cody, C.W., Prasher, D.C., Westler, W.M., Prendergast, F.G., Ward, W.W., Chemical structure of the hexapeptide chromophore of the Aequorea green-fluorescent protein.  Biochemistry, 32(5), 1212-1218 (1993).
 Chalfie, M., Tu, Y., Euskirchen, G., Ward, W.W., Prasher, D.C., Green fluorescent protein as a marker for gene expression.  Science, 263(5148), 802-805 (1994).
 Heim, R., Prasher, D.C., Tsien, R.Y., Wavelength mutations and posttranslational autoxidation of green fluorescent protein.  Proc. Natl. Acad. Sci. USA, 91(26), 12501-12504 (1994).
 Prasher, D.C., Using GFP to see the light.  Trends Genet., 11(8), 320-323 (1995).
 Haseloff, J., Siemering, K.R., Prasher, D.C., Hodge, S., Removal of a cryptic intron and subcellular localization of green fluorescent protein are required to mark transgenic Arabidopsis plants brightly.  Proc. Natl. Acad. Sci. USA, 94(6), 2122-2127 (1997).
 Bernon, G., Schander, C., Prasher, D., Robinson, D., Survey and status of terrestrial slugs in North America   American Malacological Society Abstracts 2000, 41 (2000).
 Barr, NB, Cook, A., Elder, P., Molongoski, J., Prasher, D., Robinson D.G. Application of a DNA barcode using the 16S rRNA gene to diagnose pest Arion species in the USA. " J. Moll. Stud. 75: 187-191 (2009).

See also 
 Nobel Prize controversies

References

External links
 TerraSig blog, Nobel Prize heartbreak - Dr Douglas Prasher
In Cites, An interview with Martin Chalfie, Ph.D.
 Davidson College, Green Fluorescent Protein as a Reporter Gene
 The Green Fluorescent Protein or GFP
 The Scientist.com, on-line discussion, "What about Douglas Prasher?"
 Adam Smith, Telephone interview with Martin Chalfie following the Nobel Prize announcement
 Ned Potter, "The Man Who Missed the Nobel Prize".  ABC News Blog, Science and Society, 10 October 2008.
 Marc Zimmer, Connecticut College webpage on GFP
 

American molecular biologists
Living people
1951 births
Ohio State University Graduate School alumni